Andrés Fernández de Córdova Nieto (8 May 1892 – 3 October 1983) was President of Ecuador from December 1939 to August 1940. He was Presidents of the Chamber of Deputies from February 1939 to August 1940. 

He later ran in the presidential election of 1968, losing to José Maria Velasco Ibarra.

Sources
http://www.worldstatesmen.org/Ecuador.html
Rulers.org

Presidents of Ecuador
Presidents of the Chamber of Deputies of Ecuador
1892 births
1983 deaths